Rupert is an elevated station on the Millennium Line of Metro Vancouver's SkyTrain rapid transit system. The station is located on Rupert Street in Vancouver, British Columbia, Canada.

Nearby businesses include the BC Liquor Distribution Branch and the Vancouver Film Studios. Falaise Park is also located just south of Rupert station.

Station information

Transit connections

Rupert station provides connections within Vancouver and is also serviced by HandyDART. Routes are as follows:

References

Millennium Line stations
Railway stations in Canada opened in 2002
Buildings and structures in Vancouver